Dagmar Berková (6 June 1922 in Vienna – 29 May 2002 in Prague)  was a Czech  graphic designer, illustrator and painter. She was predominant in children's book illustration, in particular the illustrations for Lewis Carroll's Alice in Wonderland or Hans Christian Andersen's fairy tales.

See also
List of Czech painters

References

Czech illustrators
Czech women illustrators
Czech women painters
Czech children's book illustrators
Czech graphic designers
1922 births
2002 deaths
Artists from Vienna
20th-century Czech painters
Austrian emigrants to Czechoslovakia